
Jawor County is a unit of territorial administration and local government (powiat) in Lower Silesian Voivodeship, south-western Poland. It came into being on January 1, 1999, as a result of the Polish local government reforms passed in 1998. Its administrative seat is the town of Jawor; the only other town in the county is Bolków.

As of 2019 the total population of the county is 50,315, out of which the population of Jawor is 22,890, the population of Bolków is 4,990, and the rural population is 22,435.

Neighbouring counties
Jawor County is bordered by Legnica County to the north, Środa Śląska County to the east, Świdnica County to the south-east, Wałbrzych County and Kamienna Góra County to the south, and Jelenia Góra County and Złotoryja County to the west.

Administrative division
The county is subdivided into six gminas (one urban, one urban-rural and four rural). These are listed in the following table, in descending order of population.

References

 
Land counties of Lower Silesian Voivodeship